Raymond Cannon (born Ulises Tildmann Cannon; September 1, 1892 – June 7, 1977) was an American actor, film director, screenwriter, journalist, and author known for his work with D. W. Griffith and Buster Keaton.

Background
Ulises Tillman Cannon was born September 1, 1892 in Long Hollow, Tennessee to Newton Cannon and Sarah Lincoln Bolinger. In 1910 he was working at a soda fountain in Knoxville, but after leaving divinity school, he moved west, performing in vaudeville and working as a journalist in Dallas and Fort Worth. In April 1918, Cannon became a journalist for Elmer M. Robbins' weekly magazine Camera! The Digest of the Motion Picture Industry. E.M. Robbins died in 1920 and Cannon bought the magazine in 1921, co-publishing it with Lola B Robbins until he sold his interest in 1922. On February 19, 1929, Cannon married Fanchon Royer, an actress-turned-journalist who began as society editor, then assistant editor, and then editor at Camera! until leaving it in 1922. She and Cannon divorced in 1931.

Career

When Cannon reached Los Angeles in the early 1910s, he was using the name Raymond and his first acting job was in Long Beach in 1912 performing at the Bentley Grand Theater. He then found work in films with the Thomas Ince Company. His first film role was in the Selig Polyscope serial The Adventures of Kathlyn in 1913. Cannon worked for D. W. Griffith and appeared in several Dorothy Gish films. When Griffith moved his productions to Mamaroneck, New York, Cannon remained in Los Angeles as a freelancer working with Douglas MacLean. In 1924, Cannon left acting and began screenwriting. In 1925, Cannon had been hired by Buster Keaton and co-wrote the 1925 film Go West, after which Keaton loaned him to Universal Studios and Cannon did not return. After numerous projects as film director and screenwriter, his last film effort was Samurai for Cavalcade Pictures in 1945, after which he turned his attentions to Los Angeles stage. One of his productions Her Majesty the Prince, starred Carla Laemmle.

Entering semi-retirement at the urging of his doctor, Cannon turned his attention to his hobby of sport fishing off the Baja coast. He subsequently wrote the books How to Fish the Pacific Coast (1952) and The Sea of Cortez (1965), as well as authoring a fishing column in Western Outdoor News for 24 years. Laemmle became his long-term typist, illustrator, researcher, and editor. He and Laemmle remained companions until his death in 1977 from complications resulting from treatment for lung cancer.

Filmography

Actor

 The Adventures of Kathlyn (1913)
 Boots (1919) as The chauffeur 
 True Heart Susie (1919) as Sporty Malone
 Nugget Nell (1919) as The City Chap
 Nobody Home (1919) as Crandall Park
 Turning the Tables (1919) as Monty Feverill
 Mary Ellen Comes to Town (1920) as 'Beauty' Bender
 Chickens (1921) as Willie Figg
 Penny of Top Hill Trail (1921) as Jo Gary
 The Unfoldment (1922) as Jack Nevin
 Watch Your Step (1922) as Lon Kimball
 His Back Against the Wall (1922) as Jimmy Boyle
 Mary of the Movies (1923) as Oswald Tate
 The Printer's Devil (1923) as Alec Sperry

Director

 Red Wine (1928)
 Joy Street (1929)
 Why Leave Home? (1929)
 Taking Ways (1930)
 Ladies Must Play (1930)
 The Victim (1930)
 Imagine My Embarrassment (1930)
 Swanee River (1931)
 Night Life in Reno (1931)
 Hotel Variety (1933)
 The Outer Gate (1937)
 Swing It, Sailor! (1938)
 Samurai (1945)

Screenwriter

 The Yankee Consul (1924) 
 Never Say Die (1924)
 Introduce Me (1925) (story)
 Go West (1925) (scenario) 
 The Carnival Girl (1926) (titles & story)
 The Whole Town's Talking (1926) (adaptation and scenario)
 Taxi! Taxi! (1927) (adaptation) 
 Fast and Furious (1927) (adaptation) 
 The Rejuvenation of Aunt Mary (1927)
The Broncho Buster (1927)
 Something Always Happens (1928) 
 Red Wine (1928) 
 Joy Street (1929) 
 Taking Ways (1930) 
 Imagine My Embarrassment (1930)
 Old Age Pension (1935)
 My Girl Sally (1935)
 His Last Fling (1935)
 Bring 'Em Back a Lie (1935)
 Tailspin Tommy in The Great Air Mystery (1935)
 Samurai (1945)

References

External links

1892 births
1977 deaths
Deaths from lung cancer in California
American male silent film actors
American male film actors
20th-century American male actors
American directors
American male screenwriters
Male actors from Tennessee
20th-century American male writers
20th-century American screenwriters